Karaşar can refer to:

 Karaşar, Beypazarı
 Karaşar, Çerkeş
 Karaşar, Göynücek